Perspective is the second studio album by the guitarist Jason Becker, released independently on May 21, 1996, through Jason Becker Music and reissued on May 22, 2001, through Warner Bros. Records.

According to Becker's web site, the album features "Steve Perry, Michael Lee Firkins, Matt and Gregg Bissonette, Steve Hunter, members of Bobby McFerrin’s Voicestra and members of the San Francisco Girls Chorus."

Track listing

Musicians
 Jason Becker - guitar, orchestration
 Ehren Becker - bass guitar
 Caren Anderson - soprano vocals
 Danny Alvarez - keyboards, organ, percussion, piano, Synclavier
 Gary Becker - classical guitar
 Gregg Bissonette - drums, fretless bass
 Joey Blake - vocals
 Cathy Ellis - soprano vocals
 Steve Hunter - rain stick, clean guitar, "that cool harmonic thing", production
 Raz Kennedy - choir/chorus, vocals 
 Steve Perry - guest vocals
 Melanie Rath - soloist, vocals
 Steve Rosenthal - cymbals, snare drums
 Gary Schwantes - bamboo flute
 David Stuligross - trombone
 Anisha Thomas - soprano vocal
 Rick Walker - percussion
 Michael Lee Firkins - guitar

Personnel
 Jason Becker - composer, cover design, mixing, art direction 
 Danny Alvarez - digital enhancement, editing, engineer, 
 Mike Bemesderfer - digital enhancement, editing, engineer, mixing, WX7 wind controller
 Gary Becker - executive producer, illustrations, introduction, paintings, photography, 
 Annie Calef - cover art concept, graphic design
 Dave Collins - mastering
 Glen A. Frendel - engineer
 Tony Mills - engineer 
 Chris Minto - engineer
 Jeff Sheehan - assistant engineer
 John Lowry - engineer

References

External links
In Review: Jason Becker "Perspective" at Guitar Nine Records

Jason Becker albums
1996 albums
Warner Records albums